Events from the year 1881 in Canada.

Incumbents

Crown 
 Monarch – Victoria

Federal government 
 Governor General – John Campbell, Marquess of Lorne 
 Prime Minister – John A. Macdonald
 Chief Justice – William Johnstone Ritchie (New Brunswick)
 Parliament – 4th

Provincial governments

Lieutenant governors 
Lieutenant Governor of British Columbia – Albert Norton Richards (until June 21) then Clement Francis Cornwall 
Lieutenant Governor of Manitoba – Joseph-Édouard Cauchon  
Lieutenant Governor of New Brunswick – Robert Duncan Wilmot  
Lieutenant Governor of Nova Scotia – Adams George Archibald     
Lieutenant Governor of Ontario – John Beverley Robinson   
Lieutenant Governor of Prince Edward Island – Thomas Heath Haviland 
Lieutenant Governor of Quebec – Théodore Robitaille

Premiers    
Premier of British Columbia – George Anthony Walkem  
Premier of Manitoba – John Norquay 
Premier of New Brunswick – John James Fraser   
Premier of Nova Scotia – Simon Hugh Holmes  
Premier of Ontario – Oliver Mowat    
Premier of Prince Edward Island – William Wilfred Sullivan 
Premier of Quebec – Joseph-Adolphe Chapleau

Territorial governments

Lieutenant governors 
 Lieutenant Governor of Keewatin – Joseph-Édouard Cauchon
 Lieutenant Governor of the North-West Territories – David Laird (until December 3) then Edgar Dewdney

Events
January 17 – The Interprovincial Bridge connecting Ottawa to Hull, Quebec, opens
February 16 – The Canadian Pacific Railway is incorporated
April 4 – The 1881 census finds Canada's population to be 4,324,810
May 24 – The overloaded steamer Victoria' capsizes on the Thames River near London, Ontario, killing 182 people.
October – Clifton, Ontario, is renamed to Niagara Falls.
December 2 – Quebec election: Joseph-Adolphe Chapleau's Conservatives win a majority

Full date unknown
Manitoba's boundaries are extended north, east and west.  Ontario disputes the eastward extension.

Births
January 2 – Frederick Varley, artist and member of the Group of Seven (d.1969)
January 20 – Fred Dixon, politician (d.1931)
June 17 – Tommy Burns, only Canadian born world heavyweight champion boxer (d.1955)
September 27 – James Ralston, lawyer, soldier, politician and Minister (d.1948)
October 23 – Al Christie, film director, producer and screenwriter (d.1951)
November 4 – Hector Authier, politician, lawyer and news reporter/announcer (d.1971)
November 19 – Robert James Manion, politician (d.1943)
December 20 – Télesphore-Damien Bouchard, politician (d.1962)
December 29 – George Washington Kendall (d.1921)
December 31 – Albert Sévigny, politician (d.1961)
December 31 – Elizabeth Arden (birth name, Florence Nightingale Graham), founder, Elizabeth Arden cosmetics (d.1966)

Deaths
January 28 – Luc Letellier de St-Just, politician and 3rd Lieutenant Governor of Quebec (b. 1820)

Historical documents
John A. Macdonald expounds on CPR's troubled past and secure future in House of Commons speech

British editorial labels CPR and Canada bad investments

Wilfrid Laurier accuses Conservatives of "having sacrificed the public cause to personal cupidity"

Governor General speaks on prospects of Northwest Territories

Importance of steamboats to colonization along Saskatchewan River

Ojibwa entertain Governor General at Rat Portage (Kenora), Ont. (Note: racial stereotypes)

Chief Poundmaker tells Cree and Blackfoot legends to Governor General on tour

Colourful Blackfoot riders meet Governor General (Note: "savage" and other stereotypes)

Journalist describes beautiful Qu'Appelle Valley in gorgeous sunset

Nova Scotia woman tries to find maid for $4/month, and describes some of the work

References
  

 
Years of the 19th century in Canada
Canada
1881 in North America